Eucalyptus hebetifolia is a species of mallee that is endemic to southern Western Australia. It has smooth grey and brownish bark with loose ribbons of bark near the base, lance-shaped adult leaves, flower buds in groups of up to thirteen, creamy white flowers and conical to barrel-shaped fruit.

Description
Flowering occurs between December and March and the flowers are creamy white or very pale yellow.

Taxonomy and naming
Eucalyptus hebetifolia was first formally described in 1991 by Ian Brooker and Stephen Hopper from a specimen collected near Tincurrin. The description was published in the journal Nuytsia. The specific epithet hebetifolia is derived from the Latin hebes, 'dull' and folium, 'leaf', referring to the dull leaves that contrast with those of E. phaenophylla.

Distribution and habitat
This mallee grows on higher ground in undulating terrain in sandy-loamy soils over laterite, mainly in the central wheatbelt.

Conservation status
Eucalyptus hebetifolia is classified as "not threatened" by the Western Australian Government Department of Parks and Wildlife.

See also
List of Eucalyptus species

References

Eucalypts of Western Australia
hebetifolia
Myrtales of Australia
Plants described in 1991
Mallees (habit)
Taxa named by Ian Brooker
Taxa named by Stephen Hopper